Ancylolomia shafferi is a moth in the family Crambidae. It was described by Rougeot in 1977. It is found in Ethiopia. The head, abdomen, and thorax are a pale grey.

References

Ancylolomia
Moths described in 1977
Moths of Africa